Principe is a surname of Spanish and Italian origin. Notable persons with that surname include:
Gene Principe (born 1967), Canadian sports reporter
Joe Principe (born 1974), American rock guitarist
Lawrence M. Principe, American historian of science
Nick Principe (born 1978), American actor
Thomas Principe, American mobster; member of the Gambino crime family

Italian-language surnames
Spanish-language surnames
Occupational surnames